Abibou Toure (born October 11, 1990) is a Senegalese professional basketball player for Toyoda Gosei Scorpions in Japan.

References

1990 births
Living people
Kagoshima Rebnise players
Toyoda Gosei Scorpions players